The 2004 FIBA Diamond Ball was a basketball tournament held in Belgrade, Serbia and Montenegro, from July 31 until August 3, 2004. The FIBA Diamond Ball was an official international basketball tournament organised by FIBA, held every Olympic year prior to the Olympics. It was the 2nd edition of the FIBA Diamond Ball. The six participating teams were Angola, Argentina, Australia, host Serbia and Montenegro, China and Lithuania.

Participating teams

 – African champions
 – Americas runners-up (USA were Olympic & Americas champions)
 – Oceania champions & 2000 FIBA Diamond Ball winners
 – Asian champions
 – European champions (Greece were Olympics hosts)
 – World champions

Preliminary round

Group A
All times are local Central European Summer Time (UTC+2).

|}

Group B
All times are local Central European Summer Time (UTC+2).

|}

Final round
All times are local Central European Summer Time (UTC+2).

5th place

Third place

Final

Final standings
The final standings per FIBA official website:

See also 
 Acropolis Tournament
 Basketball at the Summer Olympics
 FIBA Basketball World Cup
 FIBA Asia Cup
 Adecco Cup
 Marchand Continental Championship Cup
 Belgrade Trophy
 Stanković Cup
 William Jones Cup
 List of events held in Belgrade Arena

References

External links 
2004 FIBA Diamond Ball Archive

Diamond Ball
Recurring sporting events established in 2004